Junior Bake Off Brasil is a Brazilian reality television competition spin-off from the main series Bake Off Brasil featuring children from ages 8 to 13.

Host and judges
The series was presented by Carol Fiorentino and judged by Fabrizio Fasano Jr. and Beca Milano. However, following production of the first season, Carol and Fasano left the show over contract disputes. Carol was replaced by Nadja Haddad in season two. Beca returned as judge and was joined by Olivier Anquier.

Key

Series overview

Ratings and reception

External links
 Junior Bake Off Brasil on SBT.com.br

References

2018 Brazilian television series debuts
2018 in Brazilian television
Reality television spin-offs
Brazil
Brazilian television series based on British television series
Television series about children
Television series about teenagers
2022 Brazilian television series endings